VolAlto Caserta is an Italian women's volleyball club based in Caserta and currently playing in the Serie A2.

Previous names
Due to sponsorship, the club have competed under the following names:
 VolAlto Caserta (2006–2015)
 Kioto Caserta (2015–2016)
 VolAlto Caserta (2016–2017)
 Golden Tulip Volalto Caserta (2017–present)

History
The club was established in July 2006 by the merge of two local women's volleyball in order to be more competitive. It started in Serie D and gained promotion to Serie C in its first season, through the years it was promoted to Series B2 and B1 before reaching the Serie A2 on 11 June 2014.

Venue
The club play its home matches at the Palazzetto dello Sport in Caserta. The venue has approximately 1,000 spectators capacity.

Team
Season 2017–2018, as of December 2017.

References

External links

 Official website 

Italian women's volleyball clubs
Volleyball clubs established in 2006
2006 establishments in Italy
Caserta
Sport in Campania